Present Arms in Dub is a remix album by UB40 released in October 1981. The album contains eight remixed instrumental versions of original tracks from Present Arms and its bonus 12" single; only the tracks "Don't Let It Pass You By" and "Don't Slow Down" are not remixed and included. The album was the first dub album to enter the UK top 40. The dub style is characterised as a mainly instrumental version of an existing song, typically emphasising the drums and bass.

Track listing of CD

"Present Arms In Dub" - 3:04
"Smoke It" - 3:23 
"B-line" - 4:36
"Kings Row" - 4:57
"Return Of Dr X" - 5:23
"Walk Out" - 3:13 
"One In Ten" - 4:15
"Neon Haze" - 4:21 
 The song "Neon Haze" ends at 4:02. At minute 4:06, begins a hidden track: it is an industrial noise that closes the album.

Track listings and connection to Present Arms CD album

The track listing shows that most of the dub versions have different song titles to those used on  Present Arms. But in keeping with typical reggae dubs, they still have some sort of song title connection to the original song title names.  
                                                     
Note ### = 12" record included free with the original album

Personnel 
UB40
 Jim Brown - drums
 Earl Falconer - bass guitar
 Ali Campbell - rhythm guitar
 Robin Campbell - lead guitar
 Michael Virtue - keyboards
 Norman Hassan - syn percussion, trombone, congas 
 Brian Travers - saxophone
 Astro - trumpet

Production
 Produced by UB40 - Ray "Pablo" Falconer 
 Recorded at - The Music Centre, Wembley
 Engineered by - Pete Wandless

UB40 albums
Dub albums
1981 remix albums